Compañía Española de Petróleos, S.A.U. (Spanish Petroleum Company), commonly known as Cepsa, is a Spanish multinational oil and gas company. It operates in several European countries as well as in Algeria, Canada, Colombia, Morocco, Brazil, and Panama.

History 

Cepsa was founded in 1929 as a private company led by Francisco Recasens, with its first refinery located at Tenerife in the Canary Islands. Because of the CAMPSA state monopoly of fuel distribution, Cepsa sold its production to that company. It expanded to lubricant production in 1950 and petrochemical products in 1955. In 1964 it opened a factory in Portugal, and in 1967 it added a second refinery at San Roque de Cádiz. After relaxations of the state monopoly, Cepsa bought a portion of Campsa petrol stations in 1992.

In 1988, Abu Dhabi's International Petroleum Investment Company (IPIC) bought a 10% stake of Cepsa. Later Elf Aquitaine bought  a 20% stake, and Cepsa became a publicly traded company in 1989. Cepsa bought a third refinery in Huelva in 1991, and entered the liquefied petroleum gas market in 1998. The company expanded to the United Kingdom, Netherlands, Canada, Algeria, Brazil, Colombia and Peru. In 2011 IPIC bought the full company for 267 million euros.

In November 2013, the firm agreed to buy Coastal Energy Co for around $2.21 billion.

Sponsorship 
Cepsa has sponsored the Spain national football team since 2007 and since 2011 has been one of the main partners of the Toro Rosso Formula One racing team.

References

External links 

Companies based in Madrid
Natural gas companies of Spain
Oil companies of Spain
Spanish brands
Automotive fuel retailers